Frederick A. Douglass High School is a public high school in the city of Oklahoma City, Oklahoma. The school is known for its role in serving African-American students in the state of Oklahoma and has produced a variety of academic researchers and civic leaders as well as military figures. Frederick Douglass Moon, the longest-serving principal at the school, went on to play a major role in the desegregation movement in the middle of the 20th century. Working from 1940 to 1961 at the High School, he went on to be elected to the Oklahoma City Board of Education in 1972 and served as its first African-American president in 1974. It is also known for its music program and the teacher, Zelia Breaux, who created the program that helped produce several notable musicians. The school began as a segregated school. It is named for Frederick Douglass.

The school is located at 900 North Martin Luther King Avenue. The Trojans are the school's mascot. The new school building was built in 2006. The school song is "Rise up O Douglassites!". It serves 9th to 12th grades. The school colors are black and orange.

According in US News in 2018, the school has about 405 students, 97 percent are minority, college readiness is about 7 percent, and slightly less than half of students are proficient in reading and math. About a quarter take Advanced Placement (AP) exams.

Students from the school protested segregation and conducted sit-ins at segregated Oklahoma City businesses.

History
The Frederick A. Douglass School, initially called the Colored School opened in Oklahoma City in 1891 between Robinson and Harvey Avenues on California Street. The original school burned and was relocated. In 1934, the school moved again. Known as the Douglass Junior-Senior High School, it was located at 600 North High Street. Charles O. Rogers served as principal from 1935 to 1940 and was replaced by Frederick Douglass Moon. By 1952, the student body had grown substantially, experiencing a 40% growth rate in enrollment between 1945 and 1952. Moon met with black leaders and the Oklahoma City School Board to plead for a new school. On January 2, 1953, a ground breaking ceremony attended by dignitaries and leaders from the black community, including James Stewart, regional head of the southwest region of the NAACP; A. D. Matthews, president of the Negro Chamber of Commerce; and Maude Brockway, former president of the Oklahoma Federation of Colored Women's Clubs. The new school was built on the site of the Oklahoma State Fairgrounds at Northeast 10th Street and Eastern Avenue. The old school building which was vacated in 1954 became the site of the F. D. Moon Junior High School, later renamed the Page-Woodson School, which operated until 1994 and in 2017 was redeveloped into apartments and a community center.

The new Douglass High School opened in September 1954, in the midst of uncertainty surrounding the recent decision to desegregate schools by the U. S. Supreme Court. The dedication ceremony for the new school, the first black senior high school in Oklahoma City was held on May 1, 1955. The school was rebuilt in 2006 at 900 N. Martin Luther King Avenue.

Music program
Zelia Breaux taught music at the school from 1918 to 1948, organizing the first junior high school band in the negro schools of Oklahoma.  Her students included Charlie Christian, Jimmy Rushing, and trumpet player turned writer Ralph Ellison. In the 1940s, she directed the Douglass High School chorus and the band became nationally known.

Alumni
 Ralph Ellison (1931)
 Charlie Christian (1940)
 Prentice Gautt - former University of Oklahoma and NFL player, college football coach, and college sports administrator
 Donda West (1967)
 Freddye Harper Williams, state legislator

See also

 Education in Oklahoma City

References

External links
 Douglass High School - USNews.com

Public high schools in Oklahoma
Schools in Oklahoma City